Southill, Weymouth is a modern suburb of Weymouth, Dorset, England, and lies about 2 miles (3 km) north of the town centre. It was developed on the western shore of Radipole Lake in several phases from the 1960s onwards.

At its centre lay a post office, confusingly and wrongly named South Hill Post Office, but this closed in January 2007. There is a small shopping centre, a community centre, a church and a pub, the John Gregory.  A primary school was built to serve the new estate in the 1970s.

Southill is part of the parish of Radipole, the hill itself coming between Radipole and Weymouth..

Transportation 
The village does not have any bus services as its only service was withdrawn in the 2010s.

References

Radipole & Southill Local Community & History
Weymouth-Dorset.co.uk
Southill Community Area

Villages in Dorset
Geography of Weymouth, Dorset